La Llave de Mi Corazón (English: The Key of My Heart) is a 2007 hit song from Juan Luis Guerra that has won numerous Latin awards.

Song information
The key of my heart written by Juan Luis Guerra is a Latin pop song from 2007, but with a focus on decades of the 50th.
Though the song is primarily written in Spanish, several parts of the lyrics are written in English. In the song, a man meets his match maker online even they do not have too much in common and wonders what he should do when he meets her thus opening "the key to his heart".

Music video
The lead female character in the video is played by actress Zoe Saldana.

Chart performance

Awards and nominations
Latin GRAMMY Awards

2008 Latin Billboard Music Awards

Versions
La Llave de Mi Corazón (Album Version)
Medicine For My Soul (English Version)
La Llave de Mi Corazón-(featuring Taboo)
Ao Chave do Meu Coração-(Portuguese Version)

References

2007 singles
2007 songs
Macaronic songs
Latin Grammy Award for Best Tropical Song
Juan Luis Guerra songs
Songs written by Juan Luis Guerra
Latin Grammy Award for Record of the Year
Latin Grammy Award for Song of the Year
EMI Televisa Music singles